Agama somalica is a species of lizard in the family Agamidae. It is a small lizard found in Somalia.

References

Agama (genus)
Agamid lizards of Africa
Reptiles of Somalia
Endemic fauna of Somalia
Reptiles described in 2013
Taxa named by Wolfgang Böhme (herpetologist)
Taxa named by Philipp Wagner